The 1973–74 Buffalo Sabres season was the Sabres' fourth season in the National Hockey League.

Offseason

NHL Draft

Regular season

Death of Tim Horton
Early on the morning of February 21, 1974, while driving on the Queen Elizabeth Way from Toronto to Buffalo in his white De Tomaso Pantera sports car, (a gift from Sabres' GM George "Punch" Imlach), Horton was involved in what is now an infamous accident. He was negotiating a curve on the QEW where it crosses over Twelve Mile Creek in St. Catharines when he lost control and hit a cement culvert. The impact flipped the vehicle and Horton was thrown. He was not wearing a seat belt. Horton was reported dead on arrival at the local hospital, aged only 44. A police officer pursuing Horton's vehicle said that he had been travelling at over 160 km/h (100 mph).

There were reports Horton had consumed a considerable amount of vodka, and was rumoured to have been taking  pain killers due to a jaw injury suffered in practice the day before. An autopsy report released in 2005 showed Horton had a blood alcohol level of twice the legal limit. The blood test also showed signs of amobarbital, which was possibly a residue from the Dexamyl pills that were found on Horton's body. The autopsy showed no indication Horton was taking painkillers as previously thought.

Season standings

Schedule and results

Player statistics

Forwards
Note: GP = Games played; G = Goals; A = Assists; Pts = Points; PIM = Penalty minutes

Defencemen
Note: GP = Games played; G = Goals; A = Assists; Pts = Points; PIM = Penalty minutes

Goaltending
Note: GP = Games played; W = Wins; L = Losses; T = Ties; SO = Shutouts; GAA = Goals against average

Playoffs
The Sabres did not qualify for the 1974 Stanley Cup playoffs, despite qualifying the previous year.

Awards and records
 Rick Martin, Left Wing, NHL First Team All-Star

References
 Sabres on Hockey Database

Buffalo Sabres seasons
Buff
Buff
Buffalo
Buffalo